Augsburg was a  of the German Navy. The vessel was laid down in April 1987 by Bremer Vulkan, in Bremen, Germany and launched on 17 September 1987. The vessel was commissioned on 3 October 1989. The ship has been deployed as part of Operation Enduring Freedom – Horn of Africa and Operation Atalanta in the Middle East and Indian Ocean and has seen service in the Mediterranean Sea. The vessel is currently based at Wilhelmshaven, Germany.

Construction and commissioning
Augsburg was laid in April 1987 at the yards of Bremer Vulkan, Bremen and launched on 17 September 1987. After undergoing trials Augsburg was commissioned on 3 October 1989. She is currently based at Wilhelmshaven as part of 4. Fregattengeschwader, forming a component of Einsatzflottille 2. She has the nickname "Wilde 13", a reference to her pennant number, and the German children's story Jim Button and the Wild 13, which was turned into a production by the marionette theatre Augsburger Puppenkiste.

Service
After commissioning Augsburg was initially assigned to 2. Fregattengeschwader, being transferred to 4. Fregattengeschwader on 9 January 2006. She has deployed several times as part of Operation Enduring Freedom – Horn of Africa, including service in the Mediterranean Sea. From 3 April 2013 to 30 August 2013 Augsburg, commanded by Fregattenkapitän Bernhard Veitl, spent five and a half months supporting Operation Atalanta. These concluded at Kiel on 20 June 2014, during which time the ships carried out manoeuvres as far north as the Arctic Circle and as far south as the Equator, visiting 13 ports in nine countries. 

On 9 April 2014 Augsburg was released from the training exercises in order to serve as an escort for the US special purpose vessel  in the eastern Mediterranean. Cape Ray was transporting Syrian chemical weapons for destruction. On 20 November 2015, Augsburg sailed from Wilhelmshaven with the replenishment ship  to take part in Operation Sophia in the Mediterranean. She was relieved from this duty on 3 December by the minehunter .

On 6 December 2015 Augsburg deployed as an escort for the French aircraft carrier  during its operations against the military group Islamic State of Iraq and the Levant.  She was released from her escort duties on 11 March, her crew being awarded the French Overseas Medal for their service, and returned to Wilhelmshaven on 24 March. On 30 August 2016 Augsburg redeployed in the Mediterranean with the Charles De Gaulle carrier group on anti-ISIL operations. She left the carrier group on 14 November to carry out patrols. She spent four days participating in NATO's maritime surveillance Operation Sea Guardian, before returning to Wilhelmshaven on 25 November 2016. On 17 September 2018 she sailed from Wilhelmshaven to replace the tender  in Operation Sophia.

References

Bremen-class frigates
1987 ships
Ships built in Bremen (state)
Frigates of Germany